Michael Patterson (born 1905) was an English professional footballer who played as an inside forward.

Career
Born in South Shields, Patterson spent his early career with The Dragon, Boldon Villa and Boldon Colliery Welfare. He moved from Boldon Colliery Welfare to Bradford City in March 1926, making 11 league appearances for the club, before moving to Doncaster Rovers in July 1927. He later played for Barnsley, Southport, Shelbourne, Shamrock Rovers, Frickley Colliery and Pilkington Recreation. At Southport he made 2 league appearances between September and October 1931.

Sources

References

1905 births
Date of death missing
Footballers from South Shields
English footballers
Bradford City A.F.C. players
Doncaster Rovers F.C. players
Barnsley F.C. players
Southport F.C. players
Shelbourne F.C. players
Shamrock Rovers F.C. players
Frickley Athletic F.C. players
Pilkington Recreation F.C. players
English Football League players
Association football inside forwards